Apeiron is an ancient cosmological concept.

Apeiron may also refer to:
 Apeiron (journal), an academic journal
 Apeiron (video game), a 1995 video game

See also 
 Apeirogon
 Aphelion